Juan Manuel Rivarola (8 August 1899 – 1985) was an Argentine chess player.

Biography
Juan Manuel Rivarola was one of the strongest chess players of Argentina in the 1920s–1930s. In 1926, he ranked 5th in Argentine Chess Championship. He was participant of several chess tournaments held in Argentina.

Juan Manuel Rivarola played for Argentina in the Chess Olympiad:
 In 1927, at second board in the 1st Chess Olympiad in London (+0, =7, -8).

His book Autobiografía ajedrecística are very interesting text with memories on Emanuel Lasker, Alexander Alekhine, Richard Réti, Siegbert Tarrasch, as well as about the chess life in Argentina before and after the Second World War.

References

External links

Juan Manuel Rivarola chess games at 365chess.com

1899 births
1985 deaths
Sportspeople from Rosario, Santa Fe
Argentine chess players
Chess Olympiad competitors
Chess writers
20th-century chess players